As the Czech Republic is considered to be the successor team of Czechoslovakia by FIFA and UEFA, they have participated in ten UEFA European Championships; three of which were as Czechoslovakia and seven of which were as the Czech Republic. As Czechoslovakia, they became European champions in 1976. As Czech Republic, they qualified for every European Championship that they have played qualifiers for, and were runners-up at Euro 1996.

Overall record

Participations as Czechoslovakia

1960 European Nations' Cup

Final tournament

Semi-finals

Third place play-off

Euro 1976

Final tournament

Semi-finals

Final

Euro 1980

Group stage

Knockout stage

Third place play-off

Participations as Czech Republic

Euro 1996

Group stage

Knockout stage

Quarter-finals

Semi-finals

Final

Euro 2000

Group stage

Euro 2004

Group stage

Knockout stage

Quarter-finals

Semi-finals

Euro 2008

Group stage

Euro 2012

Group stage

Knockout phase

Quarter-finals

Euro 2016

Group stage

Euro 2020

Group stage

Ranking of third-placed teams

Knockout phase

Round of 16

Quarter-finals

Goalscorers

References

Bibliography

 
Countries at the UEFA European Championship